Ventola is a surname. Notable people with the surname include:

Cristian Ventola (born 1997), Italian footballer
Danilo Giacinto Ventola (born 2000), Italian footballer
Gia Ventola, American fashion designer
Nicola Ventola (born 1978), Italian footballer

Italian-language surnames